Systems design interfaces, and data for an electronic control system to satisfy specified requirements. System design could be seen as the application of system theory to product development. There is some overlap with the disciplines of system analysis, system architecture and system engineering.

Overview 
If the broader topic of product development "blends the perspective of marketing, design, and manufacturing into a single approach to product development," then design is the act of taking the marketing information and creating the design of the product to be manufactured. Systems design is therefore the process of defining and developing systems to satisfy specified requirements of the user.

The basic study of system design is the understanding of component parts and their subsequent interaction with one another.

Physical design 
The physical design relates to the actual input and output processes of the system. This is explained in terms of how data is input into a system, how it is verified/authenticated, how it is processed, and how it is displayed.
In physical design, the following requirements about the system are decided.
 Input requirement, 
 Output requirements,
 Storage requirements,
 Processing requirements,
 System control and backup or recovery.

Put another way, the physical portion of system design can generally be broken down into three sub-tasks:
 User Interface Design
 Data Design
 Process Design

Web System design
Online websites such as Google, Twitter, Facebook, Amazon and Netflix are used by millions of user worldwide, as the user increase, a scalable, highly available system must be designed to accommodate a lot of user. Here are the things to consider in designing the system:
 Functional and non functional requirement
 Capacity estimation
 Database to use, Relational or NoSQL
 Vertical scaling, Horizontal scaling, Sharding 
 Load Balancing
 Master-Slave Replication
 Cache and CDN
 Stateless and Stateful servers
 Data center georouting
 Message Queue, Publish Subscribe Architecture
 Performance Metrics Monitoring and Logging
 Build, test, configure deploy automation
 Finding single point of failure
 API Rate limiting
 Service Level Agreement

See also 

 Arcadia (engineering)
 Architectural pattern (computer science)
 Configuration design
 Electronic design automation (EDA)
 Electronic system-level (ESL)
 Embedded system
 Graphical system design
 Hypersystems
 Modular design
 Morphological analysis (problem-solving)
 SCSD (School Construction System Development) project
 System information modelling
 System development life cycle (SDLC)
 System engineering
 System thinking
 TRIZ

References

Further reading 
 Bentley, Lonnie D., Kevin C. Dittman, and Jeffrey L. Whitten. System analysis and design methods. (1986, 1997, 2004).
 
 
 Hawryszkiewycz, Igor T. Introduction to system analysis and design. Prentice Hall PTR, 1994.
 Levin, Mark Sh. Modular system design and evaluation. Springer, 2015.

External links 

 Interactive System Design. Course by Chris Johnson, 1993
  Course by Prof. Birgit Weller, 2020

Computer systems
Electronic design automation
Software design